Mai Xá is an ancient village in Gio Mai Commune, Gio Linh District, Quảng Trị Province, Vietnam. This village is not only famous for its historical relic but also known for its traditional fondness for learning about the world.

History

Etymology 

The village's name derives from Sino-Vietnamese.

Village is located where three rivers of the three major rivers in Quảng Trị, the Thạch Hãn River, Hiếu River and Cánh Hòm River. So, trade in marine Mai Xá is very convenient. And because the village is located along the river so from the new formation, Mai Xá has quickly become a place teeming with population. In particular, the lord Nguyen Phuc Tan, when he dredged, canalize Cánh Hòm River, the location of Mai Xá village consecutive become a bustling commercial.

Geography 
Mai Xá village, north bordering Lâm Xuân village, south of a line Hieu River runs through the eastern borders with Mai Thị, and western borders with social Gio Quang.

Administrative divisions
Mai Xá is divided into four main hamlets:
Xóm Đồng
Xóm Rộc
Xóm Chợ
Xóm Soi

Mai Xá Chánh Communal House
Mai Xá Chánh Communal House was built nearly five centuries ago, on a high mound, with the Hieu River flows through the front house. 
This house was built by ancient architecture, type the chest Central Central, length 12 m, width 8.2 m, including 3 time, 3 bottles. Loss column components, often, move your hands are made of jackfruit wood with carvings patterns.

Above the roof is decorated home unicorn, the phoenix bird art covered with plaster and porcelain pieces to pair... Front door mounted system designed wooden "lowering the upper room. Previous projects have money to build a peace room 5m long, 3m high, is mounted between the words "Dragon", "Horse" porcelain flowers. Average room has 4 outer square head, each surface is 60 cm.  Square on the head-mounted lantern square, each side high 80 cm. 
Within the family is divided into two parts. The previous section for the holidays or for meetings, cultural activities of the village. This place has carved and two pairs of parallel sentences are intricate carvings, great place to praise home located a series of three mild meet and create conditions for people converge and build a life of no warmth. The following section is a place and put incense altar. 
Mai Xá village chief took place where many important events, and a ceremony conducted in any year of the villagers. With historical value, cultural capital is the long house, the end of 2007, Quang Tri People's Committee Decision house recognized as "historic relic provincial cities" (see picture). Over the years rain sunshine, village has degraded, it should be soon restored.

Today the village of Mai Xá still preserved many traditional, more festivals and a rich diversity of cultural values and traditions of community like high: "chạp mả", Assembly boat racing, international revenue, and down co, and for rails, bridges and fishing...

A few other features

Landscape 
Hà Cộc is considered the most beautiful landscape of Mai Xá village. This is a primitive forests, many birds that gathers most stork.

Speciality

Mai Xá's bún hến, most famous noodle dish appointment. This is a dish is made from small clam, a specialty dish of the village. Small clam brackish water species, living in concentrated Thach Han River. Small clam fresh water is, therefore, it has long since become popular dish for many people.

Beside of small clam noodles, Bánh học is a specialty of the village. This is the type of bread made from new types of plastic sticky fragrant, usually only be made on New Year. Initially, people roasted sticky rice mixed with sugar provide complete, ginger and peanuts, for the wood frame (size about 12 x 30 cm) and use small wood close to the wheel hard to make.

Images

See also 

Vietnam War
Tourism in Vietnam

External links 
Official Website
Làng Mai Xá (Vietnamese)
Đất học Mai Xá Chánh
Dòng họ Trương Quang và cuốn gia phả đỏ

References

Populated places in Quảng Trị province
Tourist attractions in Quảng Trị province